Pervis R. Atkins Jr. (November 24, 1935 – December 22, 2017) was an American football player.

Early years 
Atkins was born in Ruston, Louisiana, and raised in Oakland, California. He graduated from Oakland Technical High School in 1953.

College football 
After attending Santa Ana Junior College, he played college football at New Mexico State University, where he was a halfback, flanker, and placekicker. In 1959, he became the first of four straight New Mexico State University players to lead the nation in rushing yardage with 130 carries for 971 yards. He was the first New Mexico State University football player to be named to the Associated Press All-America first team.

In 1959, Atkins led the nation in yards per carry (7.5), total points (107), and yards per punt return (17.7). As of December 2017, he still held New Mexico State University's records for yards per carry for a career (8.1), punt return average for a career (15.1), and punt return average for a season (21. 8).

Professional football 
He played professionally in the American Football League for the Oakland Raiders in 1965 and 1966. He had previously played for the Los Angeles Rams and Washington Redskins. On April 30, 2009, Atkins was elected to the College Football Hall of Fame.

Show business 
Also an actor and producer, Atkins appeared in the 1974 feature film The Longest Yard, the made-for-TV movie The Desperate Miles, and the 1976 pilot for the TV series Delvecchio, as well as a guest-starring role in an episode of The Six Million Dollar Man. He resided in Los Angeles until his death.

Death
On December 22, 2017, Atkins died in the Los Angeles area. He had been in an assisted-living facility and had suffered from dementia. He was 82 years old.

See also

 List of American Football League players
 List of NCAA major college football yearly rushing leaders
 List of NCAA major college football yearly scoring leaders
 List of NCAA major college yearly punt and kickoff return leaders

References

1935 births
2017 deaths
20th-century African-American sportspeople
African-American players of American football
Sportspeople from Ruston, Louisiana
Players of American football from Louisiana
Los Angeles Rams players
Washington Redskins players
Oakland Raiders players
New Mexico State Aggies football players
College Football Hall of Fame inductees
American Football League players